Jennie Thornley Clarke (September 20, 1860 - December 27, 1924) was an American educator, writer, and anthologist. She was the author of Songs of the South. Choice Selections from Southern Poets from Colonial Times to the Present Day. Joel Chandler Harris, who furnished an introduction to the book, said that, as far as he knew, this volume was the first of American anthologies devoted wholly to verse produced by southern writers.

Early years and education
Jennie Thornley Clarke was born in Winston-Salem, North Carolina, September 20, 1860. She said she was a native Georgia although she was born among the F. F. Vs (first families of Vermont). Her father, John Archer Clarke, was a poet; he died in early manhood. Brought up in a library and carefully taught by her mother, Mary Ellis (West) Clarke, Jennie was twice graduated with the highest honors; first, by a female college in Georgia and afterwards (in 1889), by the University of Nashville.

Career
Immediately elected to the chair of Latin in the State Industrial College in Mississippi, she remained there until called to the same chair in the Georgia College & State University in Milledgeville. Her extraordinary memory seemed to contain a whole library, and every line of Virgil or Horace recalled to her a wealth of illustrations from ancient and modern English poets. This exceptional acquaintance with poetry, coupled with her ability and experience as a critic, made her singularly fit for the task she undertook, that of collecting the highlights of southern poetry in a volume under the title of Songs of the South. She wrote for many periodicals, chiefly educational.

Songs of the South
Songs of the South. Choice Selections from Southern Poets from Colonial Times to the Present Day (Lippincott, 1896) was collected and edited by Clarke. It included an appendix of brief biographical notes. The volume was said to have decided interest. About 150 southern poets were represented by one or more poems, including Poe, Piatt, Ryan, Welby, Lanier, Hayne, Harney, and various others. In an introduction, Harris, said: "So far as the writer knows, this volume is the first of American anthologies devoted wholly to verses produced by southern writers. There have been collections of the war poetry of the south, and there are others that deal with all forms of southern literary talent, but the following pages are given over entirely to collections from the writings of those who have made contributions to American verse."

Death
She died in Winston-Salem, December 27, 1924.

Selected works
 Songs of the South. Choice Selections from Southern Poets from Colonial Times to the Present Day (1896)

References

Bibliography

1860 births
1924 deaths
19th-century American writers
19th-century American women writers
Writers from Virginia
Educators from Virginia
19th-century American women educators
19th-century American educators
Georgia College & State University faculty
University of Nashville alumni
Women anthologists
American women academics